Throughout history, in various wars and conflicts, there have been a number of historic victories won by a smaller force, against a larger foe. Conditions and situations for these sorts of military victories against the odds have been numerous. Some victories have been pivotal to the conflict they were part of, or provided inspiration for the other forces. In many cases, because of the heroic and remarkable nature of the victories, the events have become famous in that culture. In many cases, they have lifted morale of the forces, and been remembered many years, if not hundreds of years later, by that culture or historians.

Situational conditions for military victories against the odds 

Sometimes military victories against the odds are achieved because the larger force is caught unexpectedly, where the smaller force has surprised the larger force giving it an advantage. In some cases, Corman O'Brien noted in Outnumbered and Outgunned, that complacency is a factor since the larger force is unprepared for a serious battle/threat because of its distinct size advantage. That was the case at Battle of Okehazama in which the larger force was so confident that it had started drinking in the encampment, and the smaller force attacked.

In some cases, either by luck or good management, the smaller force killed the leader, and the larger force broke following the break down of the chain of command. That was the case at the Battle of Galveston and the Battle of Okehazama  in which both leaders were killed, and the remaining forces, while still larger, stopped fighting.

In some cases, the smaller force was simply better trained or had better morale. That was the case at the Battle of Lacolle Mills (1814) in which the British regulars, well trained and with good morale, charged less well-trained American troops and forced them to flee, despite being outnumbered 12 to 1, and was a noted feature of the Battle of Kapyong, where a full Chinese division of 10,000-20,000 were successfully resisted by a battalion of 700 Canadians defending a hill defence and supported by long-range artillery barrages. O'Brien also notes that in some circumstances victory for the smaller side came down to the smaller force having better leadership, over a poorly managed larger force  for instance, the French having divided leadership at Agincourt 

In some cases, subterfuge was used. In World War II, a group of five Germans, under the command of Fritz Klingenberg, fought garrison troops and captured the entire city of Belgrade and its thousands of troops by pretending to be an entire army.

Certain battles also involved the use of defences or topographical features to get an advantage. At Agincourt, the English benefited from a position where their flanks and rear were protected by woods, and the ground in front of them was muddy from rain. This drove the oncoming french horse onto prepared wooden stake defences, and meant the French could not use their advantage of numbers

Famous military victories against the odds

Agincourt 

Another battle often noted for being a victory against all odds  was The Battle of Agincourt (1415) saw a depleted English army, led by Henry V and composed of 5,000 to 8,000 longbowmen, achieve victory over a superior French army of 15,000 to 30,000 cavalry and heavy infantry, the English being outnumbered, possibly by as much as 5 to 1. The English achieved this unexpected victory through a combination of better tactics, favorable terrain, and the missile superiority of the longbow. Henry V personally led his troops into battle and participated in hand-to-hand combat. The English adopted a defensive stance, erecting wooden fortifications and raining down arrows on the advancing French army. When the English archers ran out of arrows, they dropped their bows and using hatchets, swords, and the mallets they had used to drive their wooden stakes in, counterattacked the now shaken, fatigued, and wounded French men-at-arms massed in front of them. The French forces had sustained heavy losses, and were bogged down in the mud and encumbered in their heavy plate armor. The counter-attack from the English was a decisive blow, and the rest of the French army, having witnessed the slaughter, fled the field of battle. Henry V's victory at Agincourt, against a numerically superior French army, crippled France and started a new period in the war during which Henry V married the French princess Catherine, and their son, Henry, was made heir to the throne of France as well as of England. The battle saw the death of between 6000 and 9000 French troops, with comparatively few English losses.

The battle is a good example of a victory against the odds, where an outnumbered army used superior tactics, weapons and topography to defeat a much larger army 

Battle of Cajamarca

Battle of Cartagena de Indias

Battle of Longewala 

This battle saw 2000 Pakistani soldiers and 40 tanks attack 120 Indian troops, with a detachment of 4 warplanes that gave them air superiority.The Indian troops used subterfuge, stringing barbwire and putting up minefield markers, in areas where there were in fact no mines. The Pakistani units were forced through inferior terrain and funneled into kill zones where the numerical advantage didn't help them. The Pakistani advance stalled, not able to advance, and then eventually retreated once more Indian troops arrived. The Pakistani forces lost 200 troops in total, compared to Indian losses of just two men, and 5 camels. James Hatter, writing in the British media at the time, compared it to the Battle of Thermopylae.

Battle of Lacolle Mills (1814) 

The battle of Lacolle Mills (aka the second battle of Lacole Mills), occurring on 30 March 1814 during the War of 1812,  saw just 180 British 13th Regiment of Foot (later reinforced), in combat with a much larger force of 4000 US troops (who were also armed with artillery). Being bombarded by artillery from the US forces, the leader of the British forces, Richard Handcock initially only had 180 British regulars entrenched in the Lacolle Mill against the overwhelming force. The stout stone blockhouse resisted most of the US artillery Desperate, and running low on ammunition, Handcock's 80 men fixed bayonets and charged the US artillery, but was pushed back because of the overwhelming numbers.
The Americans made a number of attempts on the British positions, but to no avail. A Grenadier company and a light company force of 160 men in the area forced marched to assist the British, arriving just after the initial assaults began. After this, a small number of Canadian troops later arrived to assist the British. With the new men, Handcock again fixed bayonets and charged the artillery position, this time overwhelming them.
The US troops, 4000 strong, fled the battlefield  against the British/Canadian forces who in the end, only numbered some 500 in total. Major General James Wilkinson, the US commander, was subsequently relieved of command. The battle was a major triumph for the British troops.Major General Wilkinson resigned from the Army after the defeat   The US forces sufferred 254 killed to British losses of only 61

Battle of Brownstown 

In the war of 1812, 24 Native Americans attacked 200 US troops.  The US troops approached a forest and were fired at from the Indians hidden in it, at which point some of the US infantry fled. The leader of the US troops, Major Thomas Van Horne then ordered a withdrawal, at which point the whole US unit broke and fled in disorder. The Indians achieved the military victory against the odds, even though they were outnumbered 8 to 1. The Americans lost 17 people, while the Native Americans lost just 1.

Battle of Gate Pa 
The Battle of Gate Pā, on 29 April 1864, saw a larger better-armed group of British regulars attacking Māori warriors in New Zealand. The British commander, with 1700 men, attacked a group of 200 Māori. The Māori, through subterfuge and successful ambush techniques, beat the British, resulting in 31 British being killed and 80 wounded. The Māori left the area after 25 of them had died in the engagement.

Rorke's Drift 

This, possibly one of the most famous unlikely victories saw just over 150 British and colonial troops successfully defend a farmhouse against an intense assault by 3,000 to 4,000 Zulu warriors in 1879. The massive but piecemeal Zulu attacks on Rorke's Drift came very close to defeating the much smaller garrison. After repeated attacks, the Zulu force was depleted and no reinforcements were sent for further assaults on the position. Eleven Victoria Crosses were awarded to the combatants, it was the largest number of Victoria cross medals awarded by the British Government at any one battle. Despite being heavily outnumbered, the British lost only 17 dead to 351 Zulus. The event has become widely known as a battle where an underdog won against overwhelming odds

Capture of Belgrade by Fritz Klingenberg 

During World War II Fritz Klingenberg, leading a reconnaissance patrol into Belgrade, sneaked into the city through enemy lines with just 6 men. The Yugoslav Army had thousands of men stationed in the capital, having retreated to the city from the countryside in order to make a defense against the invading German army. After a number of firefights with Yugoslav troops, Klingenberg made his way to the centre of the city. Using captured trucks, and parading captured Yugoslav troops,  he presented himself to the Mayor, pretending to be a larger force. He also threatened the use of calling in the Luftwaffe and artillery strikes (though he in fact had no radio or ability to do so). Belgrade had been bombed a few days earlier, and 2200 people had been killed. Wary of this, the Mayor surrendered to his forces, at which point Klingenberg gathered a number of German flags from the embassy and ran them up various flagpoles in the city. The Yugoslav troops gave up, believing that there had been a general surrender. Shortly, another smaller force of 15 Germans came into the city and started also pretending to be a larger group, by driving captured vehicles repeatedly around the city so as to appear to be greater in number.
Sometime later, the actual German Army arrived at the outskirts of the city, expecting to have to fight their way into the city (which had a substantial troop presence), they for a while refused to believe the city had been captured by Klingenberg. Belgrade was then fully occupied by the German Army later the same month and Belgrade became the seat of the puppet Nedić regime, headed by General Milan Nedić. Klingenberg was awarded the Knight's Cross of the Iron Cross for the capture of the city.

Battle of Kapyong 

The battle occurred during the Korean War and the Chinese Spring Offensive of April 1951. The Chinese forces outnumbered the UN battalions by a factor of five to one, or by a factor of greater than ten to one. Two battalions of the 27th British Commonwealth Brigade, each of them consisting of about 700 soldiers, the Australian 3 RAR and the Canadian 2 PPCLI, supported by the artillery of the New Zealand 16th Field Regiment and 15 American Sherman tanks, withstood the assault of the full Chinese 118th Division, numbering about 10,000-20,000 men, in continuous fighting from 23 April to 25 April. The action was of crucial strategic significance as the Kapyong Valley was the traditional invasion route to Seoul, and potentially would enable the encirclement of US forces in Korea. The Australian 3 RAR resisted the Chinese attacks on Hill 504 during 23/24 April until threatened with being surrounded, and then retreated off the battlefield, together with the American tanks. These UN units were no longer engaged in the battle.

The Chinese then assaulted the Canadian 2 PPCLI defending Hill 677 in a last stand, who were outnumbered in the combat engagement area by at least ten to one. With his battalion encircled, abandoned by supporting units, and without possibility of resupply of ammunition, Lt. Col. Stone issued the order "No retreat, no surrender", and resisted mass attacks of Chinese infantry throughout the night of 24/25 April. The Canadians called in artillery fire directly onto some of their own positions on two occasions when overrun. After fierce fire-fights and intense artillery barrages, the Chinese withdrew on 25 April with enormous casualties of about 1,000-5,000 dead and many more wounded, mostly from artillery fire. The Canadians were exhausted of ammunition and supplies, but the Chinese failed to launch a final assault. The Australian, Canadian, New Zealand and US casualties amounted to 49 dead and 111 wounded.

This is a good example of victory against superior military numbers.

Boudican Revolt

The Boudican Revolt was an assault by 230,000 Celtic tribesmen against a Roman army of 10,000. When reinforcements failed to arrive, the Roman governor moved his forces into a bottlenecked valley, forcing the uncoordinated Celts to come to him. His forces first exhausted their ranged weaponry before moving forward in a tight, shielded formation, while cavalry forces harassed the sides of the enemy formation. Worsening the situation, the Celts had left their wagons blocking their route of escape, preventing routed forces from effectively fleeing. In total, around 80,000 Celts were ultimately killed, while the Roman army suffered only around 400 losses, with similar numbers injured, and the rebellion was firmly crushed.

See also
List of military disasters
Last stand

References 

Military operations